Alphonse Bongnaim is a Vanuatuan footballer who plays as a defender.

References 

Living people
1985 births
Vanuatuan footballers
Vanuatu international footballers
2012 OFC Nations Cup players
Association football defenders